Mechanic Falls is a town in Androscoggin County, Maine, United States. The population was 3,107 at the 2020 census. It is included in both the Lewiston-Auburn, Maine metropolitan statistical area and the Lewiston-Auburn, Maine metropolitan New England city and town area.

History

It was originally part of Bakerstown Plantation, granted in 1765 by the Massachusetts General Court to Captain Thomas Baker and other soldiers for their services in the 1690 Battle of Quebec. In 1795, Bakerstown Plantation was incorporated as Poland, from which Minot would be set off in 1802. The dividing line between the towns was the Little Androscoggin River, astride which developed the village of Mechanic Falls. The Poland section of Mechanic Falls was settled in 1830, the Minot in 1836 by Dean Andrews, who was drawn by its fine soil for farming and water power for mills at the falls. Named for the mechanics operating early industrial works here, Mechanic Falls developed into a small mill town, especially after the St. Lawrence and Atlantic Railroad arrived in the late 1840s. The railroad opened the village to business and trade on the direct line between Portland and Montreal.

In 1850, the first paper mill was established. Organized in 1873, the Evans Rifle Manufacturing Company made repeating rifles, which were popular with frontiersmen such as Kit Carson and Buffalo Bill Cody. Other industries produced canned goods, bricks, novelties, confectionery, packed corn, carriages, tools, machines, steam engines and boilers. In 1872, John Witham Penney began manufacturing steam engines, machinery and foundry articles in Mechanic Falls. Fourteen years later, in 1886, his two sons, A.R.and S.R. Penney became partners, formally establishing J.W. Penney and Sons which grew to become one of the greatest machine shops in Maine and was a great factor in the prosperity of Mechanic Falls. On March 22, 1893, Mechanic Falls was set off and incorporated. In 1981, Marcal Paper closed the latter of two paper mills in the town, which now has a more diversified economy and tax base.

Geography

Mechanic Falls is drained by the Little Androscoggin River.

The town is crossed by state routes 11, 26, 121 and 124. It is bordered by the towns of Poland to the south, Oxford to the northwest, and Minot to the northeast.

Demographics

2010 census

As of the census of 2010, there were 3,031 people, 1,206 households, and 811 families living in the town. The racial makeup of the town was 96.7% White, 0.3% African American, 0.5% Native American, 0.3% Asian, 0.3% from other races, and 1.9% from two or more races. Hispanic or Latino of any race were 0.8% of the population.

There were 1,206 households, of which 34.7% had children under the age of 18 living with them, 48.8% were married couples living together, 12.9% had a female householder with no husband present, 5.6% had a male householder with no wife present, and 32.8% were non-families. 24.7% of all households were made up of individuals, and 10.3% had someone living alone who was 65 years of age or older. The average household size was 2.50 and the average family size was 2.96.

The median age in the town was 39.8 years. 24.2% of residents were under the age of 18; 7.5% were between the ages of 18 and 24; 25.8% were from 25 to 44; 29.7% were from 45 to 64; and 12.8% were 65 years of age or older. The gender makeup of the town was 49.0% male and 51.0% female.

2000 census

As of the census of 2000, there were 3,138 people, 1,163 households, and 840 families living in the town. The racial makeup of the town was 97.26% White, 0.51% Black or African American, 0.64% Native American, 0.61% Asian, 0.03% Pacific Islander, 0.06% from other races, and 0.89% from two or more races. Hispanic or Latino of any race were 0.51% of the population.

There were 1,163 households, out of which 35.6% had children under the age of 18 living with them, 55.0% were married couples living together, 12.2% had a female householder with no husband present, and 27.7% were non-families. 21.4% of all households were made up of individuals, and 9.4% had someone living alone who was 65 years of age or older.  The average household size was 2.67 and the average family size was 3.06.

In the town, the population was spread out, with 27.1% under the age of 18, 7.6% from 18 to 24, 31.1% from 25 to 44, 22.9% from 45 to 64, and 11.3% who were 65 years of age or older.  The median age was 36 years. For every 100 females, there were 95.3 males.  For every 100 females age 18 and over, there were 92.8 males.

The median income for a household in the town was $34,864, and the median income for a family was $41,188. Males had a median income of $30,479 versus $22,391 for females. The per capita income for the town was $15,383.  About 10.4% of families and 13.8% of the population were below the poverty line, including 18.0% of those under age 18 and 18.7% of those age 65 or over.

Sites of interest

 Mechanic Falls Historical Society
 The Samuel Penney House

Education

Mechanic Falls is part of Regional School Unit #16. Kenneth Healey is the  Superintendent of Schools.

Schools in this district include Elm Street School, Minot Consolidated School, Poland Community School, Bruce Whittier Middle School and Poland Regional High School.

Notable people 

 Mike Bordick, shortstop with Major League Baseball 
 Bill Dunlop, record-setting sailor, crossed Atlantic in 9 foot Winds Will 
 David Dunn, 18th governor of Maine
 Frank Haven Hall, inventor of the Hall Braille Writer and other Braille printing devices
 Marshall Kirk, librarian, writer
 Lewis L. Millett, Medal of Honor recipient, Korean War officer
 Freelan Oscar Stanley, inventor of the Stanley Steamer and builder of the Stanley Hotel, Maine native and Mechanic Falls schoolmaster, 1874–1881
 Flora E. Strout (1867–1962), teacher and social reformer
 "Edward L. Thayer", who supposedly played one game for the New York Mutuals baseball team in 1876; he was listed in The Official Encyclopedia of Baseball as having been born in Mechanic Falls. The player was actually George Fair, whose pseudonym coincidentally resembled the name of Ernest Lawrence Thayer, author of the classic baseball poem "Casey at the Bat"

See also

 Grand Trunk Station (Mechanic Falls)

References

Further reading

 Genealogy Web Project – Mechanic Falls, Maine

External links
 Town of Mechanic Falls, Maine
 Mechanic Falls Public Library
 Maine.gov – Mechanic Falls, Maine
Maine Genealogy: Mechanic Falls, Androscoggin County, Maine

 
Towns in Androscoggin County, Maine
Towns in Maine